MSPE may refer to:
Mindful Sport Performance Enhancement: a mental training program for athletes and coaches
Mean squared prediction error
Mean squared pure error
Medical School Performance Evaluation (or dean's letter): a formal, written evaluation of a medical student
Mercenaries, Spies and Private Eyes, a role-playing game written by Michael A. Stackpole and published by Flying Buffalo
Master of Science, Power Engineering